Fuscapex major is a species of sea snail, a marine gastropod mollusk in the family Eulimidae.

Description
The length of the shell is 6.2mm.

Distribution
This species occurs in the following locations:

References

 Gofas, S.; Le Renard, J.; Bouchet, P. (2001). Mollusca. in: Costello, M.J. et al. (eds), European Register of Marine Species: a check-list of the marine species in Europe and a bibliography of guides to their identification. Patrimoines Naturels. 50: 180-213

External links
 To World Register of Marine Species
 https://www.biodiversitylibrary.org/bibliography/140762 

Eulimidae
Gastropods described in 1986